Cyanogen is the chemical compound with the formula (CN)2. The simplest carbon nitride, it is a colorless and highly toxic gas with a pungent odor. The molecule is a pseudohalogen. Cyanogen molecules consist of two CN groups – analogous to diatomic halogen molecules, such as Cl2, but far less oxidizing. The two cyano groups are bonded together at their carbon atoms: N≡C‒C≡N, although other isomers have been detected. The name is also used for the CN radical, and hence is used for compounds such as cyanogen bromide (NCBr) (but see also Cyano radical.) 

Cyanogen is the anhydride of oxamide:
H2NC(O)C(O)NH2  →  NCCN  +  2 H2O

although oxamide is manufactured from cyanogen by hydrolysis:

NCCN  +  2 H2O  →  H2NC(O)C(O)NH2

Preparation
Cyanogen is typically generated from cyanide compounds. One laboratory method entails thermal decomposition of mercuric cyanide:
2 Hg(CN)2  →  (CN)2  +  Hg2(CN)2
Alternatively, one can combine solutions of copper(II) salts (such as copper(II) sulfate) with cyanides; an unstable copper(II) cyanide is formed which rapidly decomposes into copper(I) cyanide and cyanogen.
2 CuSO4  +  4 KCN  →  (CN)2  +  2 CuCN  +  2 K2SO4

Industrially, it is created by the oxidation of hydrogen cyanide, usually using chlorine over an activated silicon dioxide catalyst or nitrogen dioxide over a copper salt. It is also formed when nitrogen and acetylene are reacted by an electrical spark or discharge.

Isomers
Cyanogen is NCCN. There are less stable isomers in which the order of the atoms differs. Isocyanogen (or cyanoisocyanogen) is NCNC, diisocyanogen is CNNC, and diazodicarbon is CCNN.

Paracyanogen
 Paracyanogen is a polymer of cyanogen. It can be best prepared by heating mercuric cyanide. It can also be prepared by heating silver cyanide, silver cyanate, cyanogen iodide or cyanuric iodide. Based on experimental evidence, the structure of this polymeric material is thought to be rather irregular, with most of the carbon atoms being of sp2 type and localized domains of π conjugation.

History

Cyanogen was first synthesized in 1815 by Joseph Louis Gay-Lussac, who determined its empirical formula and named it. Gay-Lussac coined the word "cyanogène" from the Greek words κυανός (kyanos, blue) and γεννάω (gennao, I create), because cyanide was first isolated by the Swedish chemist Carl Wilhelm Scheele from the pigment "Prussian blue".
By the 1850s, cyanogen soap was used by photographers to remove silver stains from their hands.
It attained importance with the growth of the fertilizer industry in the late 19th century and remains an important intermediate in the production of many fertilizers. It is also used as a stabilizer in the production of nitrocellulose.

Cyanogen is commonly found in comets. In 1910 a spectroscopic analysis of Halley's Comet found cyanogen in the comet's tail, which led to public fear that the Earth would be poisoned as it passed through the tail. People in New York wore gas masks, and merchants sold quack-treatment "comet pills" claimed to neutralise poisoning. Because of the extremely diffuse nature of the tail, there was no effect when the planet passed through it.

Safety
Like other cyanides, cyanogen is very toxic, as it readily undergoes reduction to cyanide, which poisons the cytochrome c oxidase complex, thus interrupting the mitochondrial electron transfer chain. Cyanogen gas is an irritant to the eyes and respiratory system. Inhalation can lead to headache, dizziness, rapid pulse, nausea, vomiting, loss of consciousness, convulsions, and death, depending on exposure. 

Cyanogen produces the second-hottest-known natural flame (after carbon subnitride) with a temperature of over  when it burns in oxygen.

In popular culture
In the Doctor Who serial "The Brain of Morbius" (the 5th serial of season 13), the Doctor synthesizes cyanogen using hydrogen cyanide as a starting material and vents it through a pipe to stop Solon from performing surgery on the brain of Morbius's body, however he completes it but shortly after dies of cyanogen poisoning.

In Dragnet (1987) Friday (Dan Aykroyd) and Streebek (Tom Hanks) are tracking down the villain who stole "the pseudohalogenic compound cyanogen".

See also
Pseudohalogen

References

External links

National Pollutant Inventory - Cyanide compounds fact sheet
PhysOrg.com
CDC - NIOSH Pocket Guide to Chemical Hazards

Alkanedinitriles
Pseudohalogens
Blood agents
Lachrymatory agents